Neolith Co., Ltd.(), formerly known as  Eolith Co., Ltd. is a South Korean based video game company.

History
Company was founded as Eolith in 1996. They developed The King of Fighters 2001 and The King of Fighters 2002 after SNK was bankrupted. Their last title released as Eolith was Chaos Breaker, for the arcade system Taito Type X. Although the company was founded as an independent company, Kum Gang initially published their early arcade games. In 2000, they started a small chain of arcades called G-Park. On June 7, 2000, they registered at KOSDAQ as the first Korean arcade game maker. Besides video games, their redemption games El Dorado won the Ministry of Culture and Tourism Game of the Month June 2001 award, and Mugunghwa Kkot-i Pieosseumnida (English: The roses of Sharon have blossomed, known as Hide and Seek outside of Korea) won the Game of the Month November 2001 and Arcade Game of the Year 2001 awards. In 2000, the company M-Dream was founded by a former Eolith employee. M-Dream specialized in developing mobile games. They also developed several online games, and localized and published a number of PS2 and PC games. In November 2002, the subsidiary M-Dream China was formed. In 2003, Eolith merged with M-Dream, and Choe Jeongho became the new CEO. On June 3, 2005, Eolith was bought out by Netbrain, who was later integrated into the pharma company Neurotech and thoroughly restructured. Neurotech was renamed to Neurotech Pharma on November 8, 2006, and that same day, Eolith shut down. M-Dream became a separate company again, and continued to publish mobile games until 2007 when they were also shut down. Although M-Dream was shut down, M-Dream China was still active, but their website disappeared in 2018. In May 2008, the company was rebranded as Neolith,and it was formed from the ashes of Eolith. Neolith received government support of 160,000,000 won, but never showed much as a result.

List of games

As Eolith/M-Dream

Classic series

 Screaming Hunter (1996)
 Grand Prix Derby (1997)
 Ksana (1997)
 Hidden Catch [known as Find the Wrong Picture '98 in Korea] (1998)
 Iron Fortress (1998)
 Linky Pipe (1998)
 Puzzle King: Dance & Puzzle (1998)
 Raccoon World (1998)
 Candy Candy (1999)
 Hidden Catch 2 [known as Find the Wrong Picture 2 in Korea] (1999)
 Hidden Catch 2000 [known as Find the Wrong Picture 2000 in Korea] (1999)
 KlonDike+ (1999)
 Land Breaker (1999)
 Music Station (1999)
 New Hidden Catch [known as New Find the Wrong Picture '98 in Korea] (1999)
 Penfan Girls: Step1. Mild Mind  [known as Ribbon: Step1. Mild Mind in Japan] (1999)
 Hidden Catch 3 [known as Find the Wrong Picture 3 in Korea] (2000)
 Steal See (2000; developed by Moov Generation)
 Fortress 2 Blue Arcade (2001)
 Hidden Catch 3 Plus [known as Find the Wrong Picture 3 Plus in Korea] (2001)
 The King of Fighters 2001 (2001; published by SNK) - co-developed with BrezzaSoft
 Crazy War (2002)
 The King of Fighters 2002 (2002; published by Playmore) - co-developed with Playmore
 BnB Arcade (2003; developed by Nexon)
 Burning Striker (2003)
 Hidden Catch Movie: Wonderful Days [known as Find the Wrong Picture Movie: Wonderful Days in Korea] (2003)
 Chaos Breaker (2004; co-developed with Taito)
 Snow Fighter (2004; developed by Cenozoic Entertainment)
 X-Monster (2004, cancelled)

Redemption series

 Dance Machine 18 [also known as DM 18] (2000)
 Mugunghwa Kkot-i Pieosseumnida [English: The Roses of Sharon Have Blossomed, known as Hide and Seek outside of Korea] (2001) 
 Dream Shoot (2002)
 El Dorado (2002, distributed by Skee-Ball in the USA)
 Rolling Blues (2002)
 Shooting Master (2002)
 Alice in Cardland (2003)

For mobile phones
 2003 Ponpoko
 Bubble Bobble
 Bubble Bobble 2
 Bunny Girl Matgo
 Chain Shot
 Deep Labyrinth
 Donggeupsaeng: Part 1
 Donggeupsaeng: Part 2
 Donggeupsaeng: Part 3
 Double Dragon
 First Groove
 Fishing Master
 Galaga
 Gateun Geurim Chatgi
 Guardian Storm (unrelated to the 1998 arcade game by Afega)
 Heroes: Pride of Hero
 Hwanggeum-ui Daeryuk
 Ikkeul Mikkeul Kung
 Janggi Alkkagi
 Jeoncharo Go! 3D
 Junggi Gapbobyeong X
 The King of Fighters: Part 1
 The King of Fighters: Part 2
 Linkle Harmony
 Meoseum Mandeulgi
 Moon Patrol
 Mr. Driller
 Myeongpum Matgo
 Narsillion
 New Rally-X
 Pac-Man
 Pang Panic
 Pinball Dragoon
 Puzzle Bobble
 Puzznic
 Rally-X
 Ring King
 Safari Hunter
 Samurai Shodown: Part 1
 Shooting Soccer 2002 
 Street Fighter III
 Tajja Go Stop
 Tajja Poker
 Teullin Geurim Chatgi
 Touch Me
 Worms
 Yageun Saweon Pak Daeri

As Neolith
 CupSong Master (2008)
 PangPang Mini (2009)
 Chuck E's Ball Blast (2009, Chuck E. Cheese's version of PangPang Mini)
 Hidden Catch 5 [known as Find the Wrong Pictures 5 in Korea] (2010)
 Treasure Quest (2011, licensed from ICE)

References

External links
 Eolith Co., Ltd. profile on Arcade-History.com
 Eolith Co., Ltd. history on Hardcore Gaming 101

Defunct video game companies of South Korea
Video game companies established in 1996
Video game companies disestablished in 2005
South Korean companies established in 1996
2005 disestablishments in South Korea
Video game companies of South Korea